MoneyWiz is a money management application that runs on Microsoft Windows, Google Android, and Apple platforms, including iOS and macOS. MoneyWiz is developed by SilverWiz and is the top selling personal finance app outside of the United States as well as a Top 10 Finance App on the U.S. App Store. MoneyWiz has received awards and recognition which include being named the Best Finance App out of the Top 500 Must Have Apps by The Telegraph. It was named a Sleek Personal Finance App by Macworld and rated as one of the Top 5 Best New Year's Resolution Apps for iPhone and iPad in 2012.

MoneyWiz tracks income and expenses as well as allows users to set and track budgets. It has the ability to schedule payments and also create reports based on the information input by the user. The app also has its own syncing platform, referred to as "SYNCbits", which syncs a user's information to any device in which the app is installed. MoneyWiz supports twenty languages and is said to comply with the financial system in the countries where the official language is one of the supported ones.

SYNC-bits technology
When the company was founded in 2010, the developers of MoneyWiz were the first to create a cloud sync solution for the kind of data used in databases, as opposed to file cloud sync.

Online Banking (bank sync)
MoneyWiz connects to over 40,000 banks in over 50 countries around the world, via four different data providers, to download and categorize new transactions automatically.

See also
 List of personal finance software

References

External links
 Official Website of MoneyWiz
 MoneyWiz Review on Mac World

IOS software
Financial software